Death on Deadline is a Nero Wolfe mystery novel by American writer Robert Goldsborough, first published by Bantam in 1987, the second of Goldsborough's seven novels featuring Rex Stout's sedentary detective.

Introduction
The book opens with an unsigned introductory essay comparing Rex Stout's style to Robert Goldsborough's, and also explains that Goldsborough was the winner of a pack of would-be continuators, and compares Goldsborough's effort to that of Adrian Conan Doyle to continue Conan Doyle's Sherlock Holmes stories.  Although unsigned, the place of writing given (Mount Independence) makes it likely that the author of the introduction is John McAleer, Rex Stout's official biographer.  Bantam, Goldsborough's publisher, later inserted a note in books explaining that McAleer was indeed the author, and that it was never Bantam's intention to make a mystery out of the identity of the author of the introductory essay.

Background
In the Rex Stout corpus of Nero Wolfe stories, heavy use is made at times of a symbiotic relationship between Nero Wolfe and a fictional New York newspaper, the Gazette.  Archie Goodwin, Wolfe's right-hand man, and a senior editor at the paper, Lon Cohen, are long-time poker buddies, stretching back to the early Wolfe stories. However, none of Stout's stories involve the inner structure of the Gazette.

Catalyst to murder
In Death on Deadline, the current owners of the Gazette are getting old, and a Scottish press baron, Ian MacLaren, is expressing an interest in acquiring the Gazette as part of his quest to own a major paper in the largest city of every English-speaking country (he already has the others). Lon Cohen confides this to Archie at their weekly poker game, and Wolfe becomes concerned on a number of fronts: he likes the newspaper the way it is, he has heard bad things about MacLaren's other newspapers, and his preferred relationship with the press may be threatened (Cohen, in particular, would quit/retire if MacLaren took over).

After sending Archie on a mission to get samples of several of MacLaren's newspapers for more detailed examination, Wolfe becomes alarmed enough to place a full-page advertisement in The New York Times to publicly question whether MacLaren is a suitable owner of the newspaper and to offer assistance to any parties that agree with his point of view.

Characters, in order of appearance
 Nero Wolfe — semi-retired great sedentary legendary detective on the Lower West Side of Manhattan
 Archie — Wolfe's right-hand man, and teller of the Wolfe stories in the first person
 Saul Panzer — Another recurring character in the Wolfe canon, an (implicitly) Jewish operative, top quality, who lives alone in his own apartment and hosts weekly poker games to which Lon Cohen, Archie, and Fred Durkin (qqv below), among others, are invited
 Fred Durkin — Another independent detective Wolfe frequently uses. Not as sharp or as expensive as Panzer, but frequently easier to book on short notice.
 Bill Gore — Yet another freelancer. Gore's character is not developed much in either the Rex Stout or Goldsborough stories, but is another name to insert when one is needed.
 Ian MacLaren — Scottish press baron, lately showing an interest in gaining control of the Gazette at which Lon Cohen is a senior editor.  The story begins when the threat of a takeover by MacLaren rattles Lon so that he plays badly at Saul's poker game.
 Gershmann — another Wolfe client, case ongoing when the story opens. Closing that case immediately provides an infusion of cash to the Wolfe operation, which is expensive; see the main Nero Wolfe article for insight on that point. Otherwise Gershmann plays no part in the present case.
 Studs Terkel — not a fictional person but a real author whom the fictional Wolfe likes, and by implication Goldsborough as well. In the present novel, Wolfe is reading Terkel's book The Good War.  This book-within-a-book theme is found throughout many of the Wolfe stories, even the shorter ones.  For a parallel case in which the book-within-a-book is much more famous than the Wolfe story itself, a good example is Lancelot Hogben's Mathematics for the Million, which provides a vital hint in "The Zero Clue".
 Fritz Brenner — Master chef and cook for the four men living in Wolfe's old brownstone. Functionally he also serves as a foil for Archie to explain his ideas without the high-minded slant favored by Wolfe.
 Harriett Haverhill — largest single shareholder (about 35%) of the Gazette, second wife and now widow of Wilkins Haverhill who bought the paper back in the 1930s, related by marriage to the other major shareholders: David Haverhill (stepson, about 17%), Donna Palmer (divorced stepdaughter now living in Boston, also 17%). Carolyn Haverhill, wife of David, although not a shareholder, is quickly apparent as the sharpest of the younger Haverhills. Finally there is Scott Haverhill, Harriett's step-nephew.
 Elliot Dean — Harriett Haverhill's long-time lawyer, who accompanies Harriett on her visit to Wolfe's office following the Times advertisement, despite advising her against coming and also against her own wishes.  Harriet and Elliot are Wolfe's first visitors following his Times advertisement. Dean holds 2–3% of the Gazettes stock.
 Demarest family (owners of the Gazette before Wilkins bought it) and Arlen Publishing — owners of slightly more than 12% of the Gazette
 Inspector Cramer of the Manhattan police.
 Audrey MacLaren — ex-wife of Ian MacLaren, now living in Connecticut, firmly believes Ian caused Harriet's death and engages Wolfe to investigate
 Scott Haverhill — Harriet's step-nephew, owner of 10% of the Gazette.  He tells Wolfe that Harriet has offered him the position of Publisher, provided that he sells his 10% of the Gazette to Harriet's trust.
 Carl Bishop — Publisher of the Gazette, holder of 5% of its stock.  He plans to retire soon.

Dénouement
 Wolfe sends Saul Panzer to visit Harriett's former executive secretary
 Wolfe calls the parties together in his brownstone
 First he summarizes the narrowly divided stock situation described above, including Scott's presumed defection to Harriett's camp, removing her incentive for suicide, at least by appearances.
 Next, Wolfe notes that MacLaren and Harriett met privately in the Gazette executive suite shortly before the fatal gunshot(s).
 Based on how quickly MacLaren said knew Wolfe had accepted Audrey MacLaren as a client and, but rejecting MacLaren's explanation as mendacious, Wolfe immediately suspected MacLaren had a confederate within the Harriett Haverhill camp. By assuming that person was Elliott Dean as accounting for Ian's false explanation, it also meant that a defection of Dean to the MacLaren camp was a counter-coup for MacLaren giving him narrowly more than 50% share of the stock.  Therefore, he speculated that the MacLaren/Haverhill confrontation had 3 phases
 MacLaren said he had enough commitments to gain a controlling interest
 Citing Scott's defection, Harriett claimed victory
 MacLaren cited Dean's counterdefection, giving him barely more than 50%, at which point the conservation degenerated into a shouting match and MacLaren left.
 At this point, Wolfe conjectures that Harriett summoned Dean to her office, which had been her dead husband's office years before and still contained a long-forgotten pistol inside its desk. Since her own days were numbered anyway, Wolfe speculates that she attempted to kill Elliott, but that he wrested the gun away from Harriett and later shot her. 
 Dean breaks down and says, among other things, "she was dying anyway'.

1987 American novels
Nero Wolfe novels by Robert Goldsborough